Connecticut's 96th House of Representatives district elects one member of the Connecticut House of Representatives. It encompasses parts of New Haven and East Haven and has been represented by Democrat Roland Lemar since 2011.

Recent elections

2020

2018

2016

2014

2012

References

96